John Peter Marchi (1663–1733) was a Venetian jurist, member of the Split nobility and founder and president of the Illyrian Academy (Academia Illyrika iliti vam Slovinska). Marchi supported and worked for the liberation of the Sanjak of Bosnia from the Ottoman Empire and conversion of its population to Catholicism.

Early life 

After he received his PhD in Law in Padua in 1680, Marchi returned to Split where he was a judge and legal advisor. He was librarian of the library of Ivan Paštrić.

Marchi noble family 

Marchi was the most notable member of Marchi noble family. In 1728 he received certificate which confirmed his Roman nobility membership.

Illyrian Academy 

Marchi was founder, president and member of the Illyrian Academy (Academia Illyrika iliti vam Slovinska). Marchi's intention was to support the capture of the Sanjak of Bosnia from Ottoman Empire and conversion of its population to Catholicism. He believed that Eastern Orthodox Slavs from Bosnia would convert to the religion of the new lord of Bosnia.

References

Sources 

 
 
 
 
 
 
 
 
 

1663 births
1733 deaths
Illyrian Academy
Lawyers from Split, Croatia
17th-century Venetian people
17th-century jurists
18th-century jurists
18th-century Venetian people
Catholicisation